James Brae was a professional English footballer who played as a central defender.

References

Year of birth unknown
Year of death missing
Association football defenders
Burnley F.C. players
English Football League players
English footballers